Christ's College is one of the three constituent colleges of the University of Aberdeen, the others being King's College and Marischal College. 

It was one of three colleges in Scotland founded by the Free Church of Scotland for the training of ministers following the Disruption of 1843. The other two were New College, Edinburgh and Trinity College, Glasgow.

Following the Church reunion of 1929, Christ's College became a Church of Scotland college and was also integrated into the University of Aberdeen. It now is based within the University's King's College campus in Old Aberdeen. The College's former buildings in the west end of Aberdeen are no longer used by the church or university.

The post of Master of Christ's College is still a Church of Scotland appointment, but for most purposes it is closely connected with the University of Aberdeen's School of Divinity, History and Philosophy. The current Master is the Rev. Professor John Swinton; who followed on from Rev Ian Dick Minister at Ferryhill Parish Church and the first full time Parish Minister to be appointed Master.

The principal role of Christ's College is to oversee the preparation and formation of ministerial candidates for the Church of Scotland. From its offices in the University of Aberdeen, the College collaborates closely with the divinity faculty to ensure candidates receive appropriate academic training for the ministry, funding a lectureship in Practical Theology, organizing extramural lectures and seminars, and hosting an annual lecture at the beginning of each academic year. In addition, the College maintains the Divinity Library, which serves all undergraduates within the department. It also contributes to the spiritual life of the university, organising a weekly Chapter Service during each academic term.  The College administers the Lumsden and Sachs Fellowship, awarded to the University of Aberdeen's most outstanding graduating student in Divinity and Religious Studies.

See also 
Aberdeen

Footnotes

Church of Scotland
University of Aberdeen
Bible colleges, seminaries and theological colleges in Scotland
Educational institutions established in 1846
1846 establishments in Scotland